Grenton Lionel Starlone Mapoe (born 13 July 1988) is a South African rugby union footballer. He plays mostly as a centre or winger.

Honours
 Super Rugby runner up (3) 2016, 2017, 2018
 Currie Cup winner 2021

References

External links
 
 
 

1988 births
Living people
Rugby union centres
South African rugby union players
Golden Lions players
Lions (United Rugby Championship) players
Cheetahs (rugby union) players
Free State Cheetahs players
Bulls (rugby union) players
South Africa international rugby sevens players
South Africa Under-20 international rugby union players
Kubota Spears Funabashi Tokyo Bay players
South African expatriate rugby union players
South African expatriate sportspeople in Japan
Expatriate rugby union players in Japan
South Africa international rugby union players
Sharks (Currie Cup) players
Stade Français players
Stade Niçois players
Blue Bulls players
Rugby union players from Port Elizabeth